Suami Pengganti is an Indonesian drama television series that aired on ANTV. The series premiered on 1 March 2022 replacing Menolak Talak. This series is produced by Verona Pictures and adapted from NovelToon with the same title written by Mamie. It starred Laura Theux, Ben Joshua, Rifky Balweel and Rachquel Nesia in the lead role.

Plot 
Ariana (Laura Theux), who has been in a relationship with Galvin (Ben Joshua) for quite a while and finally decided to get married.

On the day of the bachelorette party, a tragedy occurred between Ariana and Choky (Fajar Rezky), and Galvin decided to cancel the wedding.

Saka (Rifky Balweel) is willing to be Ariana's replacement husband when he hears about the disaster. A marriage that was not originally based on love, slowly began to grow in Ariana's heart, who interacts with Saka every day.

When the love begins, Ariana finds out the fact that Saka is having an affair. Ariana suspects that her two bestfriends are Celine (Rachquel Nesia) and Yuna (Nadia Shakira). In addition, Dita (Gita Virga) Saka's ex-girlfriend before marrying Ariana, who also has a crush on Saka. And Sisil (Haviva Rifda), her personal secretary, also admires Saka.

In the midst of Ariana's confusion about the attitude of the three people closest to her, Choky comes back and terrorizes her life.

Moreover, the presence of Galvin who also still loves Ariana. Will Ariana be able to save the marriage she has lived when she has accepted Saka as a husband?

Cast

Main
Laura Theux as Ariana Wiraguna: Kusuma and Devi's daughter; Saka's ex-wife; Galvin's wife. (2022–2023)
Ben Joshua as Galvin Wijaya: Wijaya and Niken's son; Ariana's ex-fiancée turned husband; Riri's ex-husband; Abian's father. (2022–2023)
Rifky Balweel as Saka Ardian Putra: Wijaya and Anjani's son; Ariana and Dita's ex-husband; Celine's ex-fiancée; Dinda's husband. (2022–2023)
Rachquel Nesia as Celine Anastasya: Sonya's daughter; Ariana's bestfriend; Saka's ex-fiancée; Dante's love interest. (2022–2023)

Recurring
Fajar Rezky as Chocky: Ariana's obsessive lover; Sisil's love-interest. (2022–2023)
Haviva Rifda as Sisil: Ariana's secretary; Wijaya's ex-lover; Chocky's love-interest. (2022)
Nadya Shakira as Yuna Irawan: Yuyun's daughter; Ariana's bestfriend; Dion's ex-lover; Tommy's wife. (2022–2023)
Tio Duarte as Kusuma Wiraguna: Devi's ex-husband; Ariana's father; Anjani's ex-lover. (2022–2023)
Helsi Herlinda as Devi Arliani: Kusuma's ex-wife; Ariana's mother. (Dead) (2022)
Erlin Sarintan as Niken Wijaya: Wijaya's second wife; Galvin's mother; Abian's grandmother. (2022–2023)
Denny Martin as Wijaya: Niken's husband; Galvin's father; Anjani's ex-husband; Abian's grandfather. (2022–2023)
Felicia Amerda as Riri Resviandira: Galvin's ex-wife; Abian's mother; Ben's love interest. (2022–2023)
Unknown / Raffan Arryan as Abian Wijaya: Galvin and Riri's son. (2022–2023) (2023)
Sani Fahreza as Tommy: Saka's best friend; Yuna's husband. (2022–2023)
Yogi Tama as Dion Saputra: Rani's husband; Yuna's ex-lover; Dita's rented husband. (2022–2023)
Wempie Bona as Bona: Saka's best friend. (2022–2023)
Gita Virga as Dita Nugroho: Saka's ex-wife. (2022–2023)
Rizky Mocil as Dr. Richi (Dead) (2022)
 as Pedro: Wiraguna's driver. (2022–2023)
Niniek Arum as Iyas: Wiraguna's maid (2022–2023)
Mehnaz Marinez as Anjani Wiryosudirjo: Saka's mother; Dante's step-mother; Wijaya's ex-wife; Kusuma's ex-lover. (2022–2023)
Carlo Milk as Dante Wiryosudirjo: Chocky's uncle; Anjani's step-son; Celine's love interest. (2022–2023)
Icha Nabilah as Dr. Dinda: Neurologist; Bram's wife; Dante's friend; Saka's obsessive lover turned wife. (2022–2023)
Zidni Adam as Ben: Riri's love interest. (2022–2023)
Ida Yahya as Ben's mother (2023)
Indra Brotolaras as Justin Ganindra: Bambang's son; Kiara's wife; Ariana's obsessive lover. (2022–2023)
Julia Van Vloten as Kiara: Justin's wife. (2022–2023)
Uwi Jasmine as Sonya: Celine's mother. (Dead) (2022)
Exan Pahlevi as Bram: Dinda's husband. (2022)
Gilang Rama as Anwar: The man who was an arranged marriage to Yuna. (2022)
Irma Fitriani as Rani: Dion's wife. (2022)
Imam Farisyah as Dr. Bayu: Galvin's friend; Ariana's psychiatrist. (2022)
Opi Bachtiar as Boy Kimochi: fortune-teller (2022)
Yuwani as Yuyun: Yuna's mother (2022)
Gracia Marcilia as Luna (2022)
Adrian Aliman as Hans Marco (2022)
Lina Fadilla as Febri Wulandari: Ridwan's wife; Saka's adopted mother. (Dead) (2022)
Ascha Soemitro as Marwan: Ipah's husband; Nuri's father. (2022)
Fauziah Daud as Ipah: Marwan's wife; Nuri's mother (2022)
Varisha Afsheen as Nuri: Marwan and Ipah's daughter. (2022)

Production

Development and premiere 

The first promo of this series was released on 23 February 2022. The storyline is based on the Novel of the same title. This series premiered on 1 March 2022.

Casting 
Laura Theux was roped in to play Ariana. Rifky Balweel was chosen to play Saka. and Ben Joshua to play the role of Galvin. Helsi Herlinda joined the cast as Devi. In September 2022, Herlinda quit the show due to her character's death.

Filming 
On 21 April 2022 the show completed 50 episodes. The show completes 100 episodes on 9 June 2022. The show as also filmed in various locations including Bali in September 2022, and Anyer Beach in October 2022. In December 2022, the show filmed in Melbourne for a special episode of Ariana and Justin's vacation while watching a concert. On 8 March 2023, this series filmed for last episode.

Controversy

IBC give written warning 
Indonesian Broadcasting Commission (IBC) imposed a written sanction on the 5 March 2022 broadcast because it featured scenes of two women consuming liquor and the depiction of both of them being drunk/staggered as a result of consuming the drink.

Awards and nominations

References 

Indonesian drama television series
Indonesian television soap operas